Peerawat Akkratum (born 3 December 1998) is a Thai professional footballer who plays as a defender for Thai League 1 club Prachuap.

International career
In August 2017, he won the Football at the 2017 Southeast Asian Games with Thailand U23.

International goals

U23

External links

Peerawat Akkatam at soccerway.com

Peerawat Akkratum
Peerawat Akkratum
1998 births
Living people
Association football defenders
Southeast Asian Games medalists in football
Peerawat Akkratum
Peerawat Akkratum
Competitors at the 2017 Southeast Asian Games
Competitors at the 2019 Southeast Asian Games
Peerawat Akkratum
Peerawat Akkratum
Peerawat Akkratum
Peerawat Akkratum